The Hoylake and West Kirby War Memorial is a 14.5-metre-high, granite four-sided obelisk which stands on Grange Hill, West Kirby, Merseyside. It was designed by British sculptor Charles Sargeant Jagger (1885–1934), who also designed the Royal Artillery Memorial at Hyde Park Corner in London. It commemorates the men and women of West Kirby and Hoylake who gave their lives in World Wars I and II.

On two sides of the obelisk stand bronze figures symbolising war and peace. On the west face is a figure of a robed woman holding a baby, a wreath of poppies and broken manacles. On the east face stands a British infantry soldier dressed for winter and standing guard with standard issue .303 rifle, bayonet fixed, a gas mask, water bottle, putties and his helmet pushed off the back of his head, and a German helmet at his feet
.

Inscriptions around the base read:

The memorial was unveiled on 16 December 1922 by the Earl of Birkenhead with 5,000 people in attendance. The Memorial is in the care of Metropolitan Borough of Wirral.

A recasting of the soldier figure now forms part of the "Drivers and Wipers" Memorial at the Shrine of Remembrance in Melbourne, Australia.

See also
Grade II* listed war memorials in England

External links

The Hoylake Memorial – National Archives

References

British military memorials and cemeteries
Buildings and structures in the Metropolitan Borough of Wirral
World War I memorials in England
World War II memorials in England
Sculptures by Charles Sargeant Jagger
Monuments and memorials in Merseyside
1922 sculptures